Camp Harmony is an unincorporated community in Restigouche County, New Brunswick, Canada.

History

The community was originally a fishing club for American millionaires.

Notable people

See also
List of communities in New Brunswick

References
 

Communities in Restigouche County, New Brunswick